From First to Last is the third album by From First to Last, released on May 6, 2008 through Suretone and Interscope Records. "Worlds Away" is the album's first single, which hit the radio on March 17. This is the first full-length album by the band without Sonny Moore (Skrillex) as lead vocalist; the band's guitarist, Matt Good, takes over from him. In contrast to the band's previous album Heroine, the album features a more accessible, alternative rock sound.

From First To Last received mixed reviews from critics, and its change in sound alienated the band's fanbase. Subsequently, despite being given a high profile marketing campaign by Suretone, the album underperformed commercially, and only reached number 81 on the Billboard 200; as a result, the band split from the label the following year.

Background
The first song on the album to be released was "Two As One", through the band's MySpace in November 2007. On January 23, one of the songs from the new album, "We All Turn Back to Dust", was released exclusively through Billboard.com.

On February 12, From First to Last released an exclusive 2-song CD through Hot Topic which featured the songs "We All Turn Back to Dust" and "I Once Was Lost, But Now Am Profound" from the band's then-upcoming album, the former of which was also released through Billboard.com. This release coincided with a Hot Topic in-store performance in Novi, Michigan on February 13. A limited quantity of the exclusive CD was available at the 2008 Take Action Tour. The song information from "We All Turn Back to Dust" revealed that the album would have 11 tracks.

Several songs off the album appeared in EA's FaceBreaker. The songs "Two As One", and "Worlds Away" are featured on the soundtracks of EA Sports games, NASCAR 09, NHL 09, and Madden NFL 09, respectively. EA Trax also features the song "I Once Was Lost, But Now Am Profound" on Need for Speed: Undercover.

"Tick Tick Tomorrow" appeared as a remix on the Underworld: Rise of the Lycans OST.

Track listing

Bonus tracks
 "Everything's Perfect" – 2:47 (Hot Topic bonus)
 "Worlds Away" (acoustic) – 4:25 (iTunes bonus)
 "Tick Tick Tomorrow" (acoustic) – 3:42 (Japan/European bonus)
 "Medicinal Reality" (acoustic) – 3:58 (Japan bonus)

Personnel

From First to Last
 Matt Good – lead vocals, lead guitar
 Travis Richter – rhythm guitar, unclean vocals
 Matt Manning – bass, background unclean vocals
 Derek Bloom – drums, percussion

Production
Josh Abraham – production
Ryan Williams – sound engineer
Marcus Samperio – assistant engineer
Tom Syrowski – assistant engineer
Ted Jensen – mastering
Brendan O'Brien – mixing
Luke Walker – additional vocal production

Additional musicians
Ken Pattengale – slide guitar (tracks 4, 5), keyboards (track 10)
Lee Dyess – cello (track 11)
Ryan Williams – keyboards (tracks 3, 7), additional guitars (track 9)
Josh Lasseter – keyboards (track 11)

Chart history
The album sold 9,765 copies in its first week; less than 1/3 of the band's previous release Heroine which sold 33,000 copies in its first week.

References

2008 albums
From First to Last albums
Interscope Records albums
Albums produced by Josh Abraham